The year 1970 in radio saw the debut of a nationally syndicated music countdown show and the incorporation of NPR.


Events
 April – KKDA in Dallas, Texas returns to rhythm and blues format.
 May 1 – Also in the Dallas/Fort Worth market, WBAP-AM 820 and WFAA-AM 570 finally end the time-share arrangement on both frequencies that had lasted since the earliest days of radio, leaving both stations free to finally adopt full-time formats.  WBAP launches a country music format that will soon become very popular. 
 July 11 – "American Top 40", hosted by Oakland, California radio personality (and show co-founder) Casey Kasem, is launched in national syndication. Created by Kasem and Don Bustany, and distributed by Watermark Inc., the program features the top 40 hits from Billboard magazine's Hot 100 chart. The show is a success and sets the standard for radio countdown programs for years to come.

No dates
Alex Bennett and his wife/producer Ronni move their show from WMCA to WPLJ in New York.
The Pop Chronicles broadcast by American Forces Radio and Television Service.

Debuts
April 3 - Week Ending, BBC Radio's long-running topical satire show (ended 1998).
April 20 - KMIH (104.5 FM, now 88.9) signs on.
July 11 – "American Top 40."
October – KBEM-FM in Minneapolis, Minnesota signs on.
5 October – First edition of BBC Radio 4's weekday consumer affairs magazine programme You and Yours (still on air).
November – WMDR (96.9 FM) of Moline, Illinois signs on, formatting religious and beautiful music.
November – KLNT-FM (97.7 FM) of Clinton, Iowa signs on.

No dates
National Public Radio incorporated, taking over the National Educational Radio Network.
Syndicated broadcasts of Adventures in Good Music with Karl Haas across the U.S. began, from WCLV.

Closings
National Educational Radio Network absorbed into the new National Public Radio.

Births
February 14 – Simon Pegg, British comedian, film and television actor, radio personality
August 16 – Bonnie Bernstein, American television and radio sports reporter and anchor.
23 November – Zoë Ball, British television and radio presenter

Deaths
Billie Burke, 84, American film, stage, radio and television actress

References 

 
Radio by year